The National Civil Aviation and Meteorological Agency of the Union of the Comoros (ANACM ) is the civil aviation authority of the Comoros. It is also in charge of investigating aviation accidents and incidents. Its head office is in Moroni.

See also

 Yemenia Flight 626

References

External links
 Agence Nationale de l'Aviation Civile et de la Météorologie 

Government of the Comoros
Comoros
Aviation organizations based in the Comoros
Organizations investigating aviation accidents and incidents
Civil aviation in the Comoros